1922 Konyaspor, formerly known as Anadolu Selçukspor and Konya Şeker SK, is a Turkish professional football club based in Konya. It was founded in 1955 and its colors are green and white. The club managed to gain promotion for the 2008–2009 season of the TFF Second League.

See also
 Konya Torku Şeker Spor - Cycling team of the club

References

External links
Official website
1922 Konyaspor on TFF.org

Football clubs in Turkey
Sport in Konya
1955 establishments in Turkey
Association football clubs established in 1955